In 1960, Billboard published the Hot R&B Sides chart ranking the top-performing songs in the United States in rhythm and blues (R&B) and related African American-oriented music genres; the chart has undergone various name changes over the decades to reflect the evolution of such genres and since 2005 has been published as Hot R&B/Hip-Hop Songs.  During 1960, 15 different singles topped the chart, based on playlists submitted by radio stations and surveys of retail sales outlets.

In the issue of Billboard dated January 4, the top spot was held by "The Clouds" by the Spacemen, the single's third week at number one.  The following week, it was displaced by "Smokie, Part 2" by Bill Black's Combo.  The group led by Bill Black, best known as the bass player on Elvis Presley's early recordings, returned to number one in April with "White Silver Sands".  The singles were the first two releases by Black's group to enter the R&B chart but would prove to be the act's only chart-toppers; Black, the group's leader would die in 1965.  Buster Brown also reached number one for the first time when "Fannie Mae" spent a single week in the top spot.  It was a surprise success for the harmonica player, who was nearly 50 years old and had never previously entered the chart.  Bobby Marchan also achieved his first number one in 1960, as did Jerry Butler, who ended the year atop the chart with "He Will Break Your Heart".

Brook Benton spent the highest total number of weeks at number one in 1960.  The singer spent nine consecutive weeks at number one with "Kiddio" between August and October and a total of 14 weeks in the top spot with two duets with Dinah Washington, "Baby (You've Got What It Takes)" and "A Rockin' Good Way (To Mess Around and Fall In Love)" for a cumulative total of 23 weeks atop the listing.  Washington also achieved a solo chart-topper with "This Bitter Earth", making the two singers the only acts to achieve three number ones during 1960.  "Baby (You've Got What It Takes)" was the first single to spend 10 consecutive weeks at number one since Billboard combined sales and airplay into a single R&B chart in 1958.  Two of 1960's R&B number ones also topped Billboards all-genre Hot 100 chart: "Cathy's Clown" by the Everly Brothers and "Save the Last Dance For Me" by the Drifters.

Chart history

See also
1960 in music
List of number-one R&B hits (United States)

References

Works cited

1960
1960 record charts
1960 in American music